The 2007 Ballon d'Or, given to the best football player in the world as judged by an international panel of sports journalists, was awarded to Kaká. This was the first year in which players from clubs outside the UEFA federation were eligible for nomination; this change also led to an increase in the voting pool to include journalists from outside UEFA countries.

Kaká was the fourth Brazilian national to win the award after Ronaldo (1997, 2002), Rivaldo (1999), and Ronaldinho (2005). He was the sixth Milan player to win the trophy after Gianni Rivera (1969), Ruud Gullit (1987), Marco van Basten (1988, 1989, 1992), George Weah (1995), and Andriy Shevchenko (2004).

The ceremony is notable as Kaká was the last player to win the Ballon D'or before the Messi–Ronaldo dominance of the award. In 2018, Croatian Luka Modrić ended the 10-year dominance following his win that year.

Rankings

References

External links
 France Football Official Ballon d'Or page

2007
2007–08 in European football